Hypsopygia olinalis, the yellow-fringed dolichomia, is a moth of the family Pyralidae. It is found in eastern North America.

The wingspan is 16–24 mm. Adults are on wing from May to August in the American north-east and from May to September in North Carolina.

The larvae feed on Quercus species.

External links
Bug Guide
Images
Moths of Maryland

Moths described in 1854
Pyralini